Najabat is a village in the Punjab province of Pakistan. It is located at 30°49'0N 74°14'0E with an altitude of 181 metres (597 feet).

References

Villages in Punjab, Pakistan